Gerard Hamill (born 29 January 1955) is an Irish boxer. He competed in the men's lightweight event at the 1976 Summer Olympics. At the 1976 Summer Olympics, he lost to Ace Rusevski of Yugoslavia.

References

1955 births
Living people
Irish male boxers
Male boxers from Northern Ireland
Olympic boxers of Ireland
Boxers at the 1976 Summer Olympics
Place of birth missing (living people)
Commonwealth Games medallists in boxing
Commonwealth Games gold medallists for Northern Ireland
Boxers at the 1978 Commonwealth Games
Lightweight boxers
Medallists at the 1978 Commonwealth Games